Phi-Sat-2 (also known as ɸ-Sat-2) is an Earth observation CubeSat mission from the European Space Agency (ESA) platform capable of running AI apps directly on board.

The AI Apps will be able to do different activities such as transforming a satellite image to a street map, detecting clouds, detect and classify maritime vessels, and to perform image compression using AI.

Mission Consortium 

The ɸ-Sat-2 mission consortium is composed of the following companies:
 Open Cosmos
 CGI
 Ubotica
 Simera CH Innovative
 CEiiA
 GEO-K
 KP Labs

Payload and Communications 

The mission includes the following payload devices:
 On-board Computer from Open Cosmos
 Multi-spectral Optical Camera from Simera CH Innovative (expected 4.75 m ground resolution)
 AI processor: Intel Movidius Myriad 2 from Ubotica

The AI processor (Intel Movidius Myriad 2) from Ubotica was already adopted on the previous Phi-Sat-1 mission.

See also 
 Phi-Sat-1
 OPS-SAT
 Phi Lab

References

Spacecraft launched in 2020
CubeSats
European Space Agency satellites
Technology demonstrations